Bringing It All Back Home is a one-act play by Terrence McNally. It is a biting satire of a middle-class family and their reaction to losing a son in Vietnam.

Productions
The play was produced in New Haven in 1969 and at the Provincetown Playhouse, New York City, 1971.

It was produced by Solid Hang at the Collective Unconscious, New York, in September 2005.

Concept
This play is one of several of McNally's that dealt with the Vietnam and Iraq wars: Botticelli (1968), Witness (1968), and Some Men (2007). Peter Wolfe (professor of English at the University of Missouri-St. Louis) notes that Bringing It All Back Home is an anti-war play, and also examines the family.

Plot
The father of the household makes obscene phone calls while his teen son and daughter fight about the illegal drugs at their high school; the mother blots it all out. Then the body of their son Jimmy, killed in the Vietnam war, arrives. A television station wants to film their reactions. Jimmy arises and wonders why he died.

References

Further reading
 Terrence McNally : 15 short plays, Terrence McNally, Smith and Kraus, Lyme, NH, c1994,

External links
 Review of Bringing It All Back Home by Scott Makin

Plays by Terrence McNally
Anti-war plays
1969 plays
One-act plays